Sara Sperati (born October 7, 1956), born as Adele Sperati, was an Italian film actress.

She was a minor starlet in 1970s Italian genre films.

Selected filmography
The Devil Is a Woman (1974, as Adele Sperati)
La nottata (1974)
I figli di nessuno (1974)
Mark of the Cop (1975)
Killer Cop (1975)
Salon Kitty (1976)
Deported Women of the SS Special Section (1976)

References

External links 
 

Italian film actresses
1956 births
Living people
20th-century Italian actresses